Moltzow is a municipality  in the Mecklenburgische Seenplatte district, in Mecklenburg-Vorpommern, Germany.

The villages of Marxhagen, Rambow and Schwinkendorf (with Langwitz, Lupendorf, Tressow and Ulrichshusen) belong to the municipality.

References

External links